The Sokolski,  or , is a Polish breed of draught horse. It is named for the town and county of Sokółka, near Białystok in north-eastern Poland, where it was first bred in the 1920s. It derives from cross-breeding of local Polish mares of Polish Coldblood type with imported Trait Belge and Ardennais stock. It is distributed mainly in the voivodeships of Lublin and Podlasie. It is clean-legged; the usual coat colour is chestnut.

The draft horses bred in Poland can be subdivided in a few horse types of which the most widespread and consolidated are Sztumski and Sokólski horses. Sokólski horses are shaped primarily due to the environment near Białystok in North-Eastern Poland, which is known for its harsh climates and poor soil quality. Sokólski were primarily small in size but adapted to their colder and poor living conditions they were soon characterized as draught horses. Sokólski were not able to be transported due to their body mass, so they later became suitable for various sledging and riding tasks.

References

Further reading 

 Jan Nozdryn-Płotnicki (1966). Koń sokólski (in Polish). Warszawa: Państwowe Wydaw. Rolnicze i Leśne.
 Tadeusz Gajdzis (2008). Koń sokólski: natura – chwała – legenda (in Polish). Białystok: Agencja Wydawniczo–Edytorska EkoPress. .

Horse breeds
Horse breeds originating in Poland